The 1987 Dow Chemical Classic was a women's tennis tournament played on outdoor grass courts that was part of the 1987 Virginia Slims World Championship Series. It was the 6th edition of the tournament and took place at the Edgbaston Priory Club in Birmingham, United Kingdom, from 8 June until 14 June 1987. The tournament suffered as a result of rain and the doubles tournament was eventually cancelled before completion of the first round matches. First-seeded Pam Shriver won the singles title.

Entrants

Seeds

Other entrants
The following players received wildcards into the main draw:
  Annabel Croft
  Sally Reeves
  Julie Salmon

The following players received entry from the qualifying draw:
  Belinda Cordwell
  Louise Field
  Nicole Muns-Jagerman
  Valda Lake
  Susan Leo
  Kumiko Okamoto
  Pascale Paradis
  Karen Schimper

The following player received a lucky loser spot:
  Maria Lindström

Finals

Singles

 Pam Shriver defeated  Larisa Savchenko 4–6, 6–2, 6–2
 It was Shriver's first title of the year and the 14th of her career.

Doubles
The doubles event was cancelled before completion of the first round matches due to the rain.

References

External links
 1987 Dow Chemical Classic draws
 ITF tournament edition detail

Dow Chemical Classic
Birmingham Classic (tennis)
Dow
Dow Chemical Classic